Haranath Chakraborty is an Indian Bengali film director. He made his directorial debut with "Mangaldeep" (1989). Many of his movies have been critically acclaimed and enjoyed commercial success.

Early life and career 
He was Born on 1 January 1959 in West Bengal. He was assistant director of Anjan Choudhury Group. His directorial debut film Mangaldeep was released in 1989.

Awards
Chakraborty's film, Ganrakal (2004) won the Bengal Film Journalists' Association – Best Clean & Entertainment Film Award.

Filmography

References

External links

1959 births
Living people
20th-century Indian film directors
Bengali film directors
21st-century Indian film directors
Film directors from West Bengal